Maryknoll Convent School (MCS) is a Roman Catholic girls' school with primary and secondary sections at Kowloon Tong, Hong Kong. It was founded by the American Maryknoll Sisters in Hong Kong in 1925 at Kowloon Tsai, Hong Kong. MCS is a prestigious school well known for its distinguished academic results and school traditions. MCS counts a total of 15 winners of the Hong Kong Outstanding Students Awards, ranking fifth among all secondary schools in Hong Kong.

History
In 1921, an organisation called Maryknoll Sisters went from the US to Hong Kong after its founder Mary Joseph Rogers said, "Let's see what God has in store for us." On 11 February 1925, Mary Paul began teaching 12 students various subjects in the Convent Parlour at 103 Austin Road. In 1931, due to the growing number of students and teachers, the school moved to 248 Prince Edward Road. The school moved again in 1936 to the current campus at 130 Waterloo Road.

In 1941, the Maryknoll Sisters left Hong Kong and closed the school because the Japanese army invaded Hong Kong. In 1945, after the Japanese surrendered, the school reopened.

In 1960, a new section was inaugurated at 5 Ho Tung Road for the secondary section. The primary section remains at 130 Waterloo Road. The Maryknoll Student Association was set up for the Secondary Section in 1967 under the guidance of Sr Jeanne Houlihan. In 1971, an experimental administrative system, a Staff Council, was set up in the Secondary Section; it was later replaced by a School Advisory Committee and General Staff Assembly in 2001. The student prefect system was instituted in 1989. The MCS Educational Trust was founded in May 1992 to advance education at Maryknoll.

Since 1997, the primary section has been converted to a whole-day school. The school's parent-teacher associations were set up in 2001–02. As of 2005, the MCS Foundation has replaced the Maryknoll Sisters as the Sponsoring Body of the school. On 16 May 2008, Maryknoll Convent School became a Declared monument of Hong Kong. The school is one of the best examples of Georgian architecture in Hong Kong. The school campus is also dubbed as 'Hong Kong's Hogwarts’

School Principal 
1925 Mary Paul McKenna oversees the opening of MBS
Primary Section
1935-1958 Ann Mary Farrell
1959–1960 Mary de Ricci Cain
1961–1967 Miriam Xavier Mug
1967–1977 Marie Corinne Rost (A.M. Session)
1977–1995 Elsie Wong (A.M. Session)
1969–1997 Hilda Kan (P.M. Session)
1995–2003 Teresa Chow (1995–1997, A.M. Session)
2003-2017 Josephine Lo
2017-present Doris Yuen
Secondary Section
1935-1958 Ann Mary Mislsl 
1959–1965 Mary de Ricci Cain
1965–1972 Rose Duchesne Debrecht
1972–1986 Jeanne Houlihan
1987–1996 Lydia Huang
1997–2002 Gloria Ko
2002–2006 Winifred Lin
2006-present Ms Melaine Lee

School Crest
The top section of the Crest comprises two lamps with a rose in between. The lamps are to remind students that "As one lamp lights another nor grows less, so nobleness enkindles nobleness". The rose is a symbol of Mary, Mother of Jesus.

The black and white section of the Crest is taken from the Dominican shield, for the Maryknoll Sisters are part of the Dominican order. The white symbolises purity and truth, and the black symbolises sacrifice.

The other colours of the Crest are blue and red, which the former one stands for loyalty and the latter stands for charity.

The Latin words "Sola Nobilitas Virtus", which mean "Virtue Alone Ennobles", at the bottom of the crest denote the school motto.

The Ghost Pine Controversy

A Norfolk Island Pine tree used to stand at a corner of the school lawn, facing the Waterloo Road Gate of the Primary Section. It was 71 years old and 23 metres tall. Known as the Ghost Pine among students, it has come to be seen as a symbol of the school.

On 10 July 2009, the Former Students' Association issued a circular inviting former students to take photos with the ghost pine and bid farewell, citing the school management's decision to cut it down in two weeks. It was understood that the school management was worried about students' and public safety should the tree collapse, as explained in Sr Jeanne Houlihan's letter to former students.

Several former students, some being specialists in landscaping and environmental science, proposed solutions to save the tree while making it safe for current students and the public. They were supported by over 2,000 students who signed a petition on Facebook to conserve the tree. The school's suggestion that the tree be chopped into smaller pieces to make souvenirs for students and former students was denounced by many former students as gruesome and analogous to ripping body parts from a corpse and sharing it among accomplices. Experts in the area, most notably Professor C.Y. Jim, Chair Professor of Geography at the University of Hong Kong, and Mr Ken So, of the Conservancy Association, were also involved in assessing the tree's health. It was assured that the tree, although tilting slightly, did not pose any immediate danger. It was later revealed that the consultancy appointed by the school earlier that year, which suggested removing the tree, had a conflict of interest, because the consultancy itself was also in the tree removal business. The company would potentially benefit from the removal works later on by presenting the case in a certain way. The claims that the consultancy made about termites were dismissed by academics and independent experts. The observation of excessive tree sap was also interpreted as safe, contrary to the consultancy report.

Some solutions put forward included fixing the trunk against the school building and installing a stabilising system for trees. The former was rejected by the school management, as the school building was declared a monument a year before and fixing the tree to the building might risk damaging the building itself.

In the end, the Government intervened and it was agreed that the tree would be conserved. The Development Bureau allocated about HKD500,000 to fund the cause.

On 4 February 2010, the school announced that due to drainage works, the roots of the tree were severely damaged beyond repair, and it was decided that the tree would be felled. The announcement caused outrage among many students, who thought that the decision was hasty and did not take into consideration expert advice. On 5 February, Mrs Helen Yu, the Supervisor of the Primary Section, herself a former student, reiterated in a Press Conference that the decision was a painful but necessary one. She also alleged that some former students were irresponsible for putting forward a conspiracy theory. On the same day, a former student issued a letter through a solicitor to the school, claiming that the school did not have the legal grounds to cut the tree.

Through an indirect channel, the former students were informed that the decision to cut the tree down had been made even before the two experts appointed by the Government had completed or submitted the report. The lack of transparency in the decision-making process and the school management's unwillingness to conserve the tree disappointed the former students.

On 6 February, at around 4 am, the Police sealed off a section of Waterloo Road between Flint Road and Boundary Street. At 6 am, the logging staff from the Leisure and Cultural Services Department started to cut down the tree in sections over the course of three hours. When the former legislator Ms Tanya Chan and a former student asked the staff to show them the permit to cut down the tree, a government official from the Development Bureau, Mr Alan Au, refused. He also refused to show the permit to the Police. At about 10.30 am, more than fifty students gathered at the Waterloo Road Gate to mourn for the tree through prayers and singing the school song.

Several former students lodged a complaint to the Ombudsman on the same day for maladministration by the following government departments, namely, the Leisure and Cultural Services Department (which oversees the Antiques and Monuments Office), the Development Bureau, the Drainage Services Department, and the Buildings Department. The former students challenged the authorities who had permitted the drainage works and whether the impact on the tree had been thoroughly considered and sufficient measures were taken to mitigate the risks. It was argued that the government departments were either not informed immediately, or left it to the school without taking remedial measures. Moreover, the decision to issue a permit to cut down the tree was in contradiction with the conclusions drawn by experts, who recommended erecting permanent support instead of cutting down the tree. The former students also questioned whether the school or the government departments had the necessary legal support to back up their operation, since neither was able to present the permit with the authorisation from the responsible authorities.

It was later reported that the school could be prosecuted for breaching requirements of the Antiquities and Monuments Ordinance in carrying out the drainage work that ultimately led to the tree being cut down. After an investigation, former Secretary for Development Carrie Lam Cheng Yuet-ngor told LegCo members that the school had not fulfilled the conditions of the permit issued for its drainage work that had resulted in damage to more than half the roots of the 70-year-old pine which the school felled. In addition, Carrie Lam said the school had also felled 18 trees in December 2008 without submitting a removal plan to the Antiquities and Monuments Office.

Alumnae
Government and Law
 Shelley Lee Lai Kuen
 Helen Yu Lai Ching Ping
 Miriam Lau Kin-yee
 Pauline Ng Man Wah

Business 
 Nina Wang Kung Yu Sum
 Ngai Man-lin, Malina
 Joyce Ng

Others
 Rachel Cheung, Hong Kong pianist
 Valerie Chow
 Nancy Kwan
 Rosamund Kwan
 Shelley Lee
 Gigi Leung
 Jenny Pat
 Michelle Reis
 Xia Meng
 Jennifer Chan (musician)

See also
 Maryknoll Sisters
 Education in Hong Kong

References

4. ^ Forever be True – The Love and Heritage of Maryknoll, 2009, by Maryknoll Convent School Education Fouundation, Hong Kong,

External links

 Secondary Section Official Website
 Primary Section Official Website
 Maryknoll Convent School Foundation
 Maryknoll Convent School Educational Trust

Kowloon Tsai
Girls' schools in Hong Kong
Educational institutions established in 1925
Catholic secondary schools in Hong Kong
Roman Catholic primary schools in Hong Kong
Maryknoll schools
Declared monuments of Hong Kong
1925 establishments in Hong Kong